Pharmaceutical fraud involves activities that result in false claims to insurers or programs such as Medicare in the United States or equivalent state programs for financial gain to a pharmaceutical company. There are several different schemes used to defraud the health care system which are particular to the pharmaceutical industry. These include: Good Manufacturing Practice (GMP) Violations, Off Label Marketing, Best Price Fraud, CME Fraud, Medicaid Price Reporting, and Manufactured Compound Drugs. Examples of fraud cases include the GlaxoSmithKline $3 billion settlement, Pfizer $2.3 billion settlement, and Merck $650 million settlement. Damages from fraud can be recovered by use of the False Claims Act, most commonly under the qui tam provisions which rewards an individual for being a "whistleblower", or relator (law).

Types of fraud

There are several different schemes used to defraud the health care system which are particular to the pharmaceutical industry.
Good Manufacturing Practice (GMP) Violations
Off Label Marketing
Best Price Fraud
CME Fraud
Medicaid Price Reporting
Manufactured Compound Drugs

GMP violations

Involve fraud with the Good Manufacturing Practice (GMP) Regulations which require manufacturers to have adequately equipped manufacturing facilities, adequately trained personnel, stringent control over the manufacturing process, appropriate laboratory controls, complete and accurate records, reports, appropriate finished product examination, and so on. Certain violations of the Good Manufacturing Practice Regulations may be the basis for a False Claims Act lawsuit.

Off-label marketing

Though physicians may prescribe drugs for off-label usage known as off-label marketing, the Food and Drug Administration (FDA) prohibits drug manufacturers from marketing or promoting a drug for a use that the FDA has not approved. A manufacturer illegally “misbrands” a drug if the drug's labeling includes information about its unapproved uses. A drug is deemed misbranded unless its labeling bears adequate directions for use. The courts have agreed with the FDA that the Food, Drug, and Cosmetic Act (FDCA) requires information not only on how a product is to be used (e.g., dosage and administration), but also on all the intended uses of the product. In 2004, whistleblower David Franklin prevailed in a suit under the False Claims Act against Warner-Lambert, resulting in a $430 million settlement in the Franklin v. Parke-Davis case. It was the first off-label promotion case successfully brought under the False Claims Act in U.S. history. Oral statements and materials presented at industry-support scientific and educational activities may provide evidence of a product's intended use. If these statements or materials promote a use that is inconsistent with the product's approved labeling, the product is misbranded under the FDCA for failure to bear labeling with adequate directions for all intended uses.

Best price fraud

A figure reported by the manufacturer to CMS in quarterly reports under the Medicaid Rebate Program, it is used to calculate the Medicaid reimbursement rate. It is defined as the lowest price available to any wholesaler, retailer, provider, health maintenance organization (HMO), nonprofit entity, or the government. BP excludes prices to the Indian Health Service (IHS), Department of Veterans Affairs (DVA), Department of Defense (DOD), the Public Health Service (PHS), 340B covered entities, Federal Supply Schedule (FSS), state pharmaceutical assistance programs, depot prices, and nominal pricing. BP includes cash discounts and free goods that are contingent upon purchase, volume discounts, and rebates. The fraud occurs as the manufacturer falsely self-reports its Best Price.

Medicaid price reporting

In order to decrease the amounts owed to states under the Medicaid Drug Rebate Program, some companies misrepresented material facts regarding the regulatory origin/status of their brand name drugs, the AMP, and/or the best price. Despite the Government's good faith reliance to charge manufacturers a unit rebate amount based upon the manufacturer's own representation of drug status, and price, some manufacturers have deceptively and fraudulently, breached their duty to deal honestly with the Government.

Manufactured compound drugs

FDA guidelines authorize pharmacists to “compound” or mix medications only in response to a physician's valid prescription. This assumes, of course, that the physician intends that the medication be compounded. The regulations further require that the mixed or compounded medications are medically necessary and not commercially available. Illegal compounding includes compounding of ingredients such that the compounded drug is tantamount to commercially available medications, involving mass manufacturing of drugs under the guise of compounding.

Federal law, including the Centers for Medicare and Medicaid Services (CMS) guidelines and the regulations of other Government Healthcare Programs, prohibit coverage of claims for “compounded” medications when the claims are submitted by a company that is mass manufacturing large amounts of unapproved drugs in violation of the Federal Food, Drug and Cosmetic Act (FFDCA), under the guise of “compounding.”

Kickbacks
Kickbacks are rewards such as cash, jewelry, free vacations, corporate sponsored retreats, or other lavish gifts used to entice medical professionals into using specific medical services. This could be a small cash kickback for the use of an MRI when not required, or a lavish doctor/patient retreat that is funded by a pharmaceutical company to entice the prescription and use of a particular drug.

People engaging in this type of fraud are also subject to the federal Anti-Kickback statute.

Examples of fraud cases
$3 billion GSK settlement. On 2 July 2012, GlaxoSmithKline pleaded guilty to criminal charges and agreed to a $3 billion settlement of the largest health-care fraud case in the U.S. and the largest payment by a drug company. The settlement is related to the company's illegal promotion of prescription drugs, its failure to report safety data, bribing doctors, and promoting medicines for uses for which they were not licensed. The drugs involved were Paxil, Wellbutrin, Advair, Lamictal, and Zofran for off-label, non-covered uses. Those and the drugs Imitrex, Lotronex, Flovent, and Valtrex were involved in the kickback scheme. The government investigation of GSK was launched largely on the basis of information provided by four whistleblowers who filed two qui tam (whistleblower) lawsuits against the company under the False Claims Act. GSK settled the whistleblowers’ lawsuits for a total of $1.017 billion out of the $3 billion settlement, the largest civil False Claims Act settlement to date.
Pfizer $2.3 billion settlement: Pfizer settled multiple civil and criminal allegations for $2.3 billion in the largest case of pharmaceutical and health care fraud in US history. The drugs involved were Bextra (an anti-inflammatory drug), Geodon (an anti-psychotic drug), Lipitor (a cholesterol drug), Norvasc (anti-hypertensive drug), Viagra (erectile dysfunction), Zithromax (antibiotic), Zyrtec (antihistamine), Zyvox (an antibiotic), Lyrica (an anti-epileptic drug), Relpax (anti-migraine drug), Celebrex (anti-inflammatory drug), and Depo-provera (birth control).
Merck $650 million settlement: Merck settled a nominal pricing fraud case in which the company was accused of taking kickbacks and violating Medicaid best price regulations for various drugs.
United States et al., ex rel. Jim Conrad and Constance Conrad v. Forest Pharmaceuticals, Inc, et al. involved a drug manufacturer selling a drug, Levothroid, that had never been approved by the FDA. These allegations settled for $42.5 million due to multiple whistleblowers stepping forward to provide detailed information on the alleged fraud. The collective reward to the relators in this case was over $14.6 million.

See also
 Big Pharma (2006) by Jacky Law
 Bad Pharma (2012) by Ben Goldacre
 Drug fraud
 Health care fraud
Lists about the pharmaceutical industry

References

External links and resources
Masterminds Behind Pharmaceutical Fraud Deserve Prison Time
Blowing the Whistle on Health Care Fraud
Health Care Fraud Prevention

Consumer fraud
Pharmaceutical industry
Pharmaceuticals policy